Carbacanthographis multiseptata is a species of corticolous (bark-dwelling) lichen in the family Graphidaceae. Found in Venezuela, it was formally described as a new species in 2022 by Shirley Cunha Feuerstein and Robert Lücking. It is only known to occur at the type locality.

The lichen has a whitish to pale beige thallus lacking both a cortex and a prothallus. It has hyaline ascospores that measure 170–200 by 12–16 μm; these spores have between 29 and 35 transverse septa. The specific epithet multiseptata refers to this characteristic feature. Carbacanthographis multiseptata contains protocetraric acid, a lichen product that can be detected using thin-layer chromatography.

References

multiseptata
Lichen species
Lichens described in 2022
Taxa named by Robert Lücking
Lichens of Venezuela